The 1982 Metro Conference men's basketball tournament was held March 4–6 at Mid-South Coliseum in Memphis, Tennessee. 

Memphis State defeated Louisville in the championship game, 73–62, to win their first Metro men's basketball tournament.

The Tigers received an automatic bid to the 1982 NCAA Tournament. Louisville received an at-large bid, and would go on to reach the Final Four.

Format
All seven of the conference's members participated. They were seeded based on regular season conference records, with the top team earning a bye into the semifinal round. The other six teams entered into the preliminary first round.

Bracket

References

Metro Conference men's basketball tournament
Tournament
Metro Conference men's basketball tournament
Metro Conference men's basketball tournament